The King of Fighters: Destiny is a Malaysian-Chinese CG animated series in The King of Fighters media franchise, produced by the Chinese studio iDragons and the Malaysian studio Animonsta Studios for the Japanese company SNK, as a promotional tie-in to the Chinese mobile game, The King of Fighters: World. Focused on its title tournament, the plot shows arriving in South Town, Kyo Kusanagi, an invitee to KOF, among other formidable fighters who have join with other two fighters to form a team and face each other. The series run between August 2017 and January 2018.

Despite mixed response due to its dated animation, Destiny was praised for its narrative as it focuses on multiple characters. The series has received over 800million views.

Plot
A man hosts a new fighting tournament known as The King of Fighters where teams composed of three fighters against others. The young Kyo Kusanagi from Japan joins with his friends Benimaru Nikaido and Goro Daimon to compete in South Town. In the same place, Terry Bogard, his adoptive brother Andy and their friend Joe Higashi aim to avenge the death of Jeff Bogard under the hands of crime lord Geese Howard. A woman named Angelina is sent to seduce Terry and kill him but the two fall in love. During the tournament, Terry fights Geese and defeats him in revenge after Angelina is murdered by his nemesis.

Kyo senses the presence of a mythological creature known as Orochi his clan sealed years ago with the help of Yasakani and Yata. As a result, Kyo takes priority in taking down the Orochi possessed warriors. With help of the Psycho Soldiers Team, Kyo and his allies save the fighters from Orochi. Shortly afterwards, the mercenary Heidern requests Kyo's and Terry's among other's help to take down the tournament's host, Rugal Bernstein, responsible for the release of the demons power. Despite being overpowered, Kyo is able to kill Rugal when having a vision of a person teaching him a new technique. The fighters escape from Rugal's destroyed ship. However, a priest named Goentiz finds Rugal and hides his body. In the final scenes, a a musician loses control of his body while Kyo embarks on a new unknown quest.

Besides the main storyline episodes, there are also episodes focused on some character's pasts including Geese, Angelina, Benimaru and how they met other characters.

Cast

Episodes

Production
Destiny was first announced in March 2017 by SNK. IDragons were honored to produce the web series based on all the recommendations they got from other people. Since The King of Fighters was commonly known for being 2D game, iDragons decided to make it a 3D series. In order to generate appealing fights, the development team bought an arcade game machine. The artists and scriptwriters were ordered to play every day. Aware that The King of Fighters was also famous for its characters, iDragons produced side stories centered around backstories. In regards to the plot, the team decided to incorporate elements from another SNK franchise, Fatal Fury, alongside The King of Fighters believing fans were also looking forward to it. The answer to the first-season cliffhanger remains as a secret according to the team.

Release
In the West it began being released for free watching on August 3, 2017, on Steam and August 10, 2017, on YouTube. In China it was broadcast on Youku, Bilibili, Tencent Video, iQIYI and Mango TV. The series' first season of 24 episodes ended on January 18, 2018.

The King of Fighters: Destiny is a tie-in for the SNK video game The King of Fighters: World (along with Tencent's mobile game also titled The King of Fighters: Destiny).

In January 2018, it was announced it is going to be followed by two more seasons and then a feature-length film, adapting the Orochi storyline, that is the early KOF games' plot from The King of Fighters '94 to The King of Fighters '97, without any dates.  The first film The King of Fighters: Awaken is scheduled to be released in 2022.

Reception 
The King of Fighters: Destiny earned mixed responses by reviewers. Kyo's portrayal in The King of Fighters: Destiny received better response due to the plot not solely focusing on his history but also other characters from the games. While finding the story dated, NSVMundoGeek considered it one of the best adaptations of The King of Fighters franchise, comparing it favourably in contrast to the live-action film that received negative reviews. IGN France reviewer was disappointed by the first three episodes, citing varying quality of graphics and his opinion inadequate sound, even as he enjoyed the mix of action and Chinese humor. Hogan Reviews enjoyed the handling of the cast as both Terry Bogard and Kyo possess their own stories across the narrative with their personalities also balancing each other. He rated it four out of five, stating he was looking forward for a sequel. Corey Lanier from Shoryuken enjoyed the climax and finale for the presentation of the fight between Kyo and Rugal and looked forward to see similar works in the future and bring Iori Yagami into the series.

The series was well received in China, winning the China Games Billboard 2018 award for most popular game-based animation.

References

External links 
 Official website
 IMDb entry

2017 anime ONAs
2017 web series debuts
Anime based on video games
Japanese animated web series
Chinese animated television series
Malaysian animated television series
Martial arts anime and manga
SNK
SNK Playmore
The King of Fighters
Works based on SNK video games
2010s YouTube series